The geology of Saint Kitts and Nevis is part of the overall Volcanic Caribbees grouping of the Lesser Antilles island arc. The oldest rocks are volcanic and sedimentary rocks form the Pliocene or Miocene.

References

Geography of Saint Kitts and Nevis
Saint Kitts and Nevis